Strike Fighter Squadron 102 (VFA-102) is a United States Navy Strike Fighter squadron based at Marine Corps Air Station Iwakuni. Their call sign is Diamond, with the tail code NF, and they fly the F/A-18F Super Hornet.

History
Two distinct squadrons have been designated VF-102. The first VF-102 was established on 1 May 1952 and redesignated VA-36 on 1 July 1955.

The second VF-102 was established in 1955, was eventually redesignated as VFA-102, and is the subject of the remainder of this article.

1950s 

Fighter Squadron 102 (VF-102), was established as VA-36 on 1 July 1955, and was immediately redesignated VF-102 on the same day (at the time, squadron designations were associated with their assigned airwing). The squadron was based at NAS Jacksonville flying the F2H Banshee. The squadron's inaugural cruise took place aboard  in July 1956.  After returning from deployment, the squadron transitioned to the F4D Skyray. In addition to four 20 mm internal cannons, the Skyray carried the new AIM-9 Sidewinder missile.

1960s

The final cruise with the Skyray on Forrestal was January through August 1961 after the squadron had moved to NAS Oceana, Virginia. It subsequently transitioned to the F-4 Phantom beginning a 20-year association with the Phantom.

In 1964 and 1966 VF-102 won the COMNAVAIRLANT Battle “E” efficiency awards. Highlights during this period included participation in Operation Sea Orbit on board , and combat operations off Vietnam in 1968.

1970s

In 1975 and 1978, VF-102 conducted cross-deck operations aboard HMS Ark Royal.
In 1971, 1973, 1974, 1975:  the squadron conducted four deployments to the Mediterranean Sea aboard USS Independence as part of Carrier Air Wing Six, including a port call in Athens, Greece, when they had a political coup; air cover operations during the Yom Kippur War; and recovery of aircraft debris and bodies from TWA Flight 841 that crashed into the Mediterranean Sea after a terrorist bomb exploded in the hold.

1980s 

In June 1981 the squadron flew their last Phantom during an Indian Ocean cruise aboard .  During the summer of 1981, the squadron transitioned to the F-14A Tomcat. With the new aircraft, the squadron also received a new mission in addition to their traditional fighter role—photo reconnaissance using the TARPS pod. The squadron deployed aboard  in late 1982 to participate in the NATO Exercise Northern Wedding that required high temperature operations in the heavy seas north of the British Isles, garnering considerable attention from Soviet Tu-95D Bear reconnaissance aircraft. The first Tomcat deployment with Carrier Air Wing One began in 1983 and took USS America through the Suez Canal to the Indian Ocean. Two VF-102 Tomcats, flying a routine TARPS mission over Somalia were fired upon by an SA-2 SAM site and AAA in April 1983.  Both aircraft returned without damage.

VF-102 deployed in 1984 with the first KA-93 LOROP camera and ARC-182 Have Quick radios, conducting Operational Evaluation for both systems at sea. In 1985, USS America participated in the NATO exercise Ocean Safari and again conducted operations in the challenging seas and low visibility conditions near the Arctic Circle and inside Vestfjord, Norway. While operating northwest of Ireland, a VF-102 TARPS aircrew flew an unprecedented 1200 nm TARPS mission to locate a Soviet Kynda Class Cruiser transiting the English Channel. A VF-102 Tomcat was first to be fired on by a Libyan SA-5 and AAA while flying Combat Air Patrol for Operation Attain Document. A month later VF-102 flew cover for US Navy and US Air Force bombers in Operation El Dorado Canyon.

1990s
In late 1990, USS America  joined  and Saratoga in the Red Sea as part of Operation Desert Shield, arriving the day operations were to begin. In the six-week campaign, VF-102 logged more than 1400 combat flight hours.

The squadron embarked on USS America again in December 1991 for a six-month deployment to the Mediterranean and Persian Gulf.

In early August 1993, the squadron embarked on USS America to begin their third Mediterranean deployment in three years. During this deployment the squadron conducted humanitarian operations off the coast of Bosnia-Herzegovina supporting Operation Provide Promise and Operation Deny Flight. In late October the squadron supported Operation Restore Hope off the coast of Mogadishu, Somalia. By mid-December they were supporting Operation Southern Watch in Iraq.

In June 1994, the squadron returned to NAS Oceana and transitioned to the F-14B aircraft. The squadron's 1995–1996 Mediterranean cruise began with an emergency sortie to the Adriatic Sea to take part in Operation Deliberate Force. They then proceeded to the Persian Gulf in support of Operation Southern Watch.  Placement of U.S. ground forces in Bosnia, led to another America emergency sortie back to the Adriatic in December. The squadron remained in the Adriatic for the remainder of the cruise, logging more than 4,000 hours and over 1,900 traps during the deployment.

With the disestablishment VF-33, VF-102 became Americas sole F-14 unit, completing its final deployment on 24 February 1996.

In 1997, the squadron deployed aboard George Washington. A port visit to Haifa, Israel was cut short late in November as the carrier battle group was ordered to the Persian Gulf in response to Saddam Hussein's barring UN weapon inspectors from carrying out their assigned tasks. VF-102 returned to Norfolk on 13 March 1998.

In Autumn 1999, VF-102 deployed again to the Persian Gulf in support of Operation Southern Watch over southern Iraq. VF-102 carried out strikes on numerous anti-aircraft and radar sites and conducted numerous TARPS missions.

2000s
On 19 September 2001 in the wake of the September 11 attacks, VF-102 began a scheduled deployment to the Arabian Sea as a part of Operation Enduring Freedom and began combat operations. During that deployment VF-102 flew 5,000 combat hours and dropped 680 bombs as well as guiding more than 50,000 pounds of precision guided munitions launched by other aircraft, VF-102 dropped more ordnance and flew more combat hours than any other F-14 unit during the war in 2001 and 2002. In addition, as part of the USS Theodore Roosevelt Battle Group they were at sea for 159 consecutive days, breaking a 20-year-old record.

Following the return from deployment, the squadron moved to NAS Lemoore, California to begin transition training in the F/A-18F. Upon completion, the squadron again changed homeport to Naval Air Facility Atsugi, Japan.

VFA-102 deployed to the Pacific Ocean aboard  in 2004, 2005, 2006 and 2007, taking part in several military exercises, including Orange Crush, Talisman Saber, Jasex, and Valiant Shield.

In March 2008, VFA-102 was named the Pacific Fleet Battle "E" award winner for the calendar year of 2007, recognizing their readiness to perform wartime tasks amongst all F/A-18E/F squadrons in the Pacific Fleet.  In March 2010, the squadron was again awarded the Pacific Fleet Battle "E".

In the spring of 2008, VFA-102 embarked on USS Kitty Hawk for her final deployment.

In 2010, the squadron transitioned to Block II Super Hornets equipped with the AN/APG-79 AESA radar.

In 2021, VFA-102 flew combat missions into Afghanistan as part of the US's Afghanistan retrograde.

References

External links

Diamondbacks Website
VF-102 History

See also
Naval aviation
Modern US Navy carrier air operations
List of United States Navy aircraft squadrons
List of Inactive United States Navy aircraft squadrons

Strike fighter squadrons of the United States Navy